, established in 603, was the first of what would be several similar cap and rank systems established during the Asuka period of Japanese history. It was adapted from similar systems that were already in place in Sui dynasty China, Paekche and Koguryŏ. The officials wore silk caps that were decorated with gold and silver, and a feather that indicated the official's rank.

The twelve cap system was replaced in 647.

Innovations
The primary distinction between this new system and the old kabane system by which a person's rank was determined based on heredity, was that the cap and rank system allowed for promotion based on merit and individual achievement. One of the more well known examples of promotion within the cap and rank system is that of Ono no Imoko. When Imoko was first sent as an envoy to the Sui court in 607, he was ranked Greater Propriety (5th rank), but he was eventually promoted to the top rank of Greater Virtue because of his achievements, particularly during his second trip to Sui in 608.

Ranks and colors
The following table lists the various ranks and the colors that were believed to have been assigned to each one.

References

External links 
 Court Ranks - The Samurai Wiki

Japanese nobility
603 establishments
7th-century establishments in Japan
Prince Shōtoku

de:Kan’i jūni kai